Pueu is a village and district on the east coast of Tahiti,  south east of Papeete and northwest by road from Tautira.

Geography 
The village lies on a lagoon.

History 
The Spaniards named the harbour within the Pueu reef "Puerto de la Virgen".

In 1958, 61.6% of the villagers of the district voted for independence.

Culture 
It hosts a spiritual festival on Christmas Day.

Pueu contains an old church and the Te Anuanua Hotel, located to the southeast of the church, with four duplex bungalows.

References

Towns and villages in Tahiti